A chess clock consists of two adjacent clocks with buttons to stop one clock while starting the other, so that the two clocks never run simultaneously. Chess clocks are used in chess and other two-player games where the players move in turn, and in some legal settings where each side is allotted a specific amount of time for arguments. The purpose is to keep track of the total time each player takes for their own moves, and ensure that neither player overly delays the game.

Chess clocks were first used extensively in tournament chess, and are often called game clocks.  The first time that game clocks were used in a chess tournament was in the London 1883 tournament as invention by Thomas Bright Wilson of Manchester Chess Club. Their use has since spread to tournament Scrabble, shogi, go, and nearly every competitive two-player board game, as well as other types of games.

The simplest time control is "sudden death", in which players must make a predetermined number of moves in a certain amount of time or forfeit the game immediately.
A particularly popular variant is blitz chess, in which each player is given a short time, such as five minutes, on the clock in which to play the entire game.

The players may take more or less time over any individual move. The opening moves in chess are often played quickly due to their familiarity, which leaves the players more time to consider more complex and unfamiliar positions later. It is not unusual in slow chess games for a player to leave the table, but the clock of the absent player continues to run if it is their turn, or starts to run if their opponent makes a move.

Analog game clocks 

Analog clocks are equipped with a "flag" that falls to indicate the exact moment the player's time has expired. Analog clocks use mechanical buttons. Pressing the button on one player's side physically stops the movement of that player's clock and releases the hold on the opponent's.

The drawbacks of the mechanical clocks include accuracy and matching of the two clocks, and matching of the indicators (flags) of time expiration. Additional time cannot easily be added for more complex time controls, especially those that call for an increment or delay on every move, such as some forms of byoyomi.

The first time that game clocks were used in a chess tournament was at the London 1883 tournament.

Early development of digital game clocks

In 1973, to address the issues with analog clocks, Bruce Cheney, a Cornell University Electrical Engineering student and chess player, created the first digital chess clock as a project for an undergraduate EE course. Typical of most inventions, it was crude compared to the products on the market many years later and was limited by the technology that existed at the time. For example, the display was done with red LEDs. LEDs require significant power, and as a result, the clock had to be plugged into a wall outlet. The high cost of LEDs at the time meant that only one set of digits could be displayed, that of the player whose turn it was to move. This meant that each player's time had to be multiplexed to the display when their time was running. In 1973, LSI chips were not readily or cheaply available, so all the multiplexing and logic were done using chips that consisted of four two-input TTL NAND gates, which resulted in excessive power consumption. Being plugged into the wall is obviously a major drawback, but had one advantage: the timebase for the clock was driven off a rectified version of 60 cycle AC current. Each player had a separate counter, and, in a parallel to the original mechanical architecture, one player's counter was disabled while the other's was running. The clock only had one mode: time ran forward. It could be reset, but not set. It did not count the number of moves. But it successfully addressed the original goals of the project (accurate and matched timing).

The first commercially available digital chess clock was patented in 1975 by Joseph Meshi and Jeffrey R. Ponsor. They named it the Micromate-80. There was only one made and this was tested by chess players in multiple tournaments. Three years later a much-improved Micromate-180 was produced alongside Meshi's MBA Thesis, "Demand Analysis for a New Product (The Digital Chess Clock)", at San Diego State University, while Meshi and Ponsor continued to develop digital gaming.

Fischer clock and related designs 

Digital clocks and Internet gaming have spurred a wave of experimentation with more varied and complex time controls than the traditional standards. Time control is commonly used in modern chess in many different methodologies. One particularly notable development, which has gained quite wide acceptance in chess, was proposed by former world champion Bobby Fischer, who in 1988 filed for US patent 4,884,255 (awarded in 1989) for a new type of digital chess clock. Fischer's digital clock gave each player a fixed period of time at the start of the game and then added a small amount after each move. Joseph Meshi called this "Accumulation" as it was a main feature of his patented Micromate-180 (US Patent 4,247,925 1978). This became the linchpin of Fischer's clock patented ten years later. In this way, the players would never be desperately short of time. This timing method is occasionally called "accumulation" but it is usually called "increment", "bonus", or "Fischer".

The increment time control was first used in the privately organised 1992 Fischer–Spassky match, and quickly became popular in the wider chess world, being subsequently used in the FIDE World Chess Championship 1998. Nowadays most top level tournaments and tournaments outside the United States use Fischer's system. An increasing number of lower level tournaments in the US are also starting to use Fischer's system. Other aspects of Fischer's patent, such as a synthesized voice announcing how much time the players have, thus eliminating the need for them to keep looking at the clock, have not been adopted.

On March 10, 1994, a patent application was filed by inventors Frank A. Camaratta Jr. of Huntsville, Alabama, and William Goichberg of Salisbury Mills, New York, for a game timer especially suitable for playing the game of chess, which employed a (simple) "delay" feature. The game timer provides, among other features, a user-definable delay between the time the activation button is pressed and the time that the activated clock actually begins to count down. United States Patent 5,420,830 was issued on May 10, 1995, and subsequently assigned to the United States Chess Federation by the inventors. As with the Fischer clock, the benefit of the delay clock is to reduce the likelihood that a player with positional or material superiority will lose a match solely because of the expiration of time on that player's time clock. In the United States, delay is still widely used, but increment is becoming more popular.

Timing methods

Increment (also known as bonus and Fischer since former World Chess Champion Bobby Fischer patented this timing method)—a specified amount of time is added to the players main time each move, unless the player's main time ran out before they completed their move. For example, if the time control is 90+30 (ninety minutes of main time per player with a thirty-second increment each move), each player gets an additional thirty seconds added to their main time for each move, unless the player's main time ran out first. Under FIDE and US Chess rules, the increment is applied to the first move as well. For example, for 3+2 each player starts with three minutes and two seconds on the first move. Not all digital clocks automatically give the increment for move one and thus for those that don't, the increment time has to be added manually to the main time so each player gets the increment for move one. In online chess, players may make multiple premoves (such as moving a knight back and forth) to give them additional time to think and/or avoid running out of time.

Bronstein delay (named after Grandmaster David Bronstein who invented this timing method)—this timing method adds time but unlike increment not always the maximum amount of time is added. If a player expends more than the specified delay, then the entire delay is added to the player's clock but if a player moves faster than the delay, only the exact amount of time expended by the player is added. For example, if the delay is ten seconds and a player uses ten or more seconds for a move, ten seconds is added after they complete their move. If the player uses five seconds for a move, five seconds is added after they complete their move. This ensures that the main time left on the clock can never increase even if a player makes fast moves. As with increment, the delay time is applied to the first move under FIDE and US Chess rules.

Simple delay (also known as US delay)—with this timing method, the clock waits for the delay period each move before the player's main time starts countdown down. For example, if the delay is ten seconds, the clock waits for ten seconds each move before the main time starts counting down.

Bronstein delay and Simple delay are mathematically equivalent. The advantage of Bronstein delay is that a player can always quickly see exactly how much time they have for their next move without having to mentally add the main and delay time. The advantage of Simple delay is that a player can always tell whether the time that is counting down is the delay time or the main time. Simple delay is the form of delay most often used in the US, while Bronstein delay is the form of delay most often used in most other countries.

See also

Chess equipment

References

Further reading

External links

 for Fischer's clock
 Online Chess Clock / Chess Timer Example, used for Fast Chess
 Online chess clock that implements Fischer and Bronstein timing methods

Chess equipment
Timers
Gaming